John "Jack" Walton was a professional rugby league footballer who played in the 1900s and 1910s. He played at club level for Wakefield Trinity (Heritage № 115), as a forward (prior to the specialist positions of), during the era of contested scrums.

Playing career

Challenge Cup Final appearances
Jack Walton played as a forward, i.e. number 11, in Wakefield Trinity's 17-0 victory over Hull F.C. in the 1909 Challenge Cup Final during the 1908–09 season at Headingley Rugby Stadium, Leeds on Tuesday 20 April 1909, in front of a crowd of 23,587.

County Cup Final appearances
Joseph Taylor played as a forward, i.e. number 10, in Wakefield Trinity's 8-2 victory over Huddersfield in the 1910 Yorkshire County Cup Final during the 1910–11 season at Headingley Rugby Stadium, Leeds on Saturday 3 December 1910.

Notable tour matches
Jack Walton played as a forward, i.e. number 8, in Wakefield Trinity's 20-13 victory over Australia in the 1908–09 Kangaroo tour of Great Britain match at Belle Vue, Wakefield on Saturday 19 December 1908.

Notable tour matches
Jack Walton made his début for Wakefield Trinity during October 1902, and he played his last match for Wakefield Trinity during the 1912–13 season.

References

External links
Search for "Walton" at rugbyleagueproject.org

Year of birth missing
Year of death missing
Place of birth missing
Place of death missing
Rugby league forwards
Wakefield Trinity players
English rugby league players